The MV Coho is a passenger and vehicle ferry owned and operated by Black Ball Line.  Black Ball's only ferry, Coho carries passengers and cars, motorcycles, trucks, semi-trailers, bicycles, etc. between Victoria, British Columbia, Canada and Port Angeles, Washington, United States.

Coho makes between two and four round trips from Port Angeles to Victoria daily, with each crossing taking about 90 minutes and covering .  The peak summer season has the most trips per day and the winter season the fewest.

Construction and design
Coho was designed by Philip F. Spaulding & Associates, of Seattle and is named after the coho salmon commonly found in the United States' Pacific Northwest. Coho was the first large vessel built on the West Coast in 20 years solely with private financing. The vessel was built by Puget Sound Bridge and Dredging Company in Seattle, Washington and made her first sailing to Victoria, British Columbia on December 29, 1959. She was originally powered by two Cooper-Bessemer diesel engines rated at  each. In 2004 she was refitted with two V-12 Electro-Motive Division (EMD)12-645F7B diesels rated at  each. Coho has twin  stainless propellers with twin rudders.

Terrorist incident

Coho made news on December 14, 1999, when Ahmed Ressam was arrested by border authorities in Port Angeles, Washington after he attempted to enter the United States via Victoria on Coho with home-made explosives and timing devices hidden in his car. He admitted he and accomplices had planned to bomb Los Angeles International Airport on New Year's Eve, 1999.

Notes

External links

MV Coho at Black Ball Ferry Line (official site)
M/V Coho underway
Designer, builder and owner of M/V Coho on her bridge during sea trials, 1959

Ferries of Washington (state)
Ferries of British Columbia
Ships built by Lockheed Shipbuilding and Construction Company
Motor vessels of Washington (state)
1959 ships